Negera unispinosa is a moth in the family Drepanidae. It was described by Watson in 1965. It is found in Malawi.

References

Endemic fauna of Malawi
Moths described in 1965
Drepaninae
Moths of Africa